Sonatala Upazila is an upazila of Bogra District in the Division of Rajshahi, Bangladesh.
Sonatala Thana was established in 1981 and was converted into an upazila in 1984. It is named after its administrative center, the town of Sonatala.

Geography
It borders Rangpur Division to the north, Sariakandi Upazila to the east and south, Gabtali Upazila to the south and west, and Shibganj Upazila, Bogra to the west.

Beels
Goborchapa Beel
 Gobochanra Beel
 Thengar Beel
 Mohicharan Beel
 Padir Beel
 Satbeel
 Chunepacha beel

Demographics

According to the 2011 Bangladesh census, Sonatala Upazila had 45,869 households and a population of 186,778, 13.2% of whom lived in urban areas. 10.6% of the population was under the age of 5. The literacy rate (age 7 and over) was 43.2%, compared to the national average of 51.8%.

Economy

Famous markets (Hat)
 Sonatola Hat
 Balua Hat
 Karamja Hat
 Sayed Ahmed College Hat
 Pakulla Hat
Horikhali hat

Administration
Sonatala Upazila is divided into Sonatala Municipality and seven union parishads: Balua, Digdair, Zorgachha, Madhupur, Pakulla, Sonatala Sadar, and Tekani Chukainagar. The union parishads are subdivided into 94 mauzas and 131 villages.

Sonatala Municipality is subdivided into 9 wards and 16 mahallas.

Transport
Rail stations Sayeed Ahmed College, Bhelurpara, and Sonatala are on the branch line connecting Santahar and Kaunia. In July 2014 they were served by six or eight intercity and six mail trains a day.

Education

There are three colleges in the upazila. Government Nazir Akhter College, founded in 1967, is the only public one. A private one is Balua Hat Degree College, founded in 1987. Govt. Sonatola Model High School & College founded in 1908.

The madrasa education system includes one fazil madrasa.

See also
 Upazilas of Bangladesh
 Districts of Bangladesh
 Divisions of Bangladesh

References

Upazilas of Bogra District